In chemistry, the pentagonal planar molecular geometry describes the shape of compounds where five atoms, groups of atoms, or ligands are arranged around a central atom, defining the vertices of a pentagon.

Examples
Both are derived from the pentagonal bipyramid with two lone pairs occupying the apical positions and the five fluorine atoms all equatorial.

References

Stereochemistry
Molecular geometry